What We Live For is the second studio album by American pop rock band American Authors, produced by returning collaborators Aaron Accetta and Shep Goodman. Running at 42 minutes and comprising twelve tracks, the album was released worldwide by Island Records on July 1, 2016. The album marks the third major release by the band under the American Authors moniker, and largely continues the sound of their debut album, Oh, What a Life.

What We Live For debuted at number 60 on the Billboard 200 and spawned four singles: "Go Big or Go Home", "Pride", "What We Live For" and "I'm Born to Run". To promote the album, the band went on a U.S. tour to promote the record ahead of its release.

Background and recording

In March 2014, American Authors released their debut studio album, Oh, What a Life, after many years releasing extended plays under the moniker The Blue Pages. American Authors enjoyed considerable success with the album, gaining significant exposure, especially through adult contemporary radio. Their success is largely due to the commercial boom of their hit single, "Best Day of My Life", which by April 2015 had been certified 3× Platinum by the Recording Industry Association of America, marking sales exceeding three million. Drummer Matt Sanchez described the band's achievements; "truthfully, most people don’t realize we’ve been a band for about eight years, so success seems like it’s come in marathon form and we still got a long way to go." Heading into the creative process for their follow-up album, the band expressed a preference to preserve most of the sound that made "Best Day of My Life" and Oh, What a Life commercially successful, but with a more mature feel, citing the need to reflect the growth of the band as artists.

Songwriting and early recording sessions for the band's follow-up to Oh, What a Life began as early as on tour in 2014. While serving as a supporting act on the Native Summer Tour, the band entertained the idea of co-writing a song with OneRepublic's frontman Ryan Tedder, hoping to add what American Authors frontman Zac Barnett as "the Ryan Tedder touch". The band continued to write and record new songs for the album during their time on the 13th Annual Honda Civic Tours and tours throughout 2015, with some songs even being premiered and exercised live in their tours, such as "Nothing Better" and "Pride". Principal recording commenced in early to mid 2015, and was primarily recorded with producers Aaron Accetta and Shep Goodman, who had previously worked with the band on their eponymous extended play and Oh, What a Life. While the band had an extensive set of songs at the beginning of the sessions, enough to create an album outright, the band exercised their material and continued to write and record new songs well into 2016.

Composition

What We Live For largely continues the sound of the band's debut studio album, Oh, What a Life. Lead singer Zac Barnett stated that "we tried to take a lot of the stuff that our fans like and love about us from Oh, What a Life and take that to the next level as far as sounds go. [We] brought back some of the old instruments like mandolin and banjo, but also experimented with a lot of different sounds like vocal samples. We brought back a lot of piano [and] bigger harmonies." Lyrically, the album builds on Oh, What a Lifes biographical themes, which followed the band's origins and journey; What We Live For documents the band's experiences during the present and their perspective on the future.

Promotion
"Go Big or Go Home", which would ultimately appear as the seventh track on the final album, was released in May 2015 as a single, after the band's last single promoting Oh, What a Life, "Luck", was released a year previously. "Pride" also appeared on a single in December 2015, and was also solicited as a promotional single to United States adult contemporary radio thereafter. What We Live For was officially unveiled by the band and Island Records on March 2, 2016, with pre-orders for both a digital download and compact disc version of the album being made available the same day. The album's opening two tracks, "What We Live For" and "I'm Born to Run" were also made available to purchase in April 2016, on the album's page on iTunes. Supporting the album, the band embarked on a 19-date tour of the United States from March through to May 2015, performing songs appearing on the new album live, in the lead-up to its release. It was announced through the band's Facebook page that the album's release date was pushed nearly two months from their original date, saying they are "putting the finishing touches" on their album and planned to release new music videos before their album was available in stores.

Reception

Critical

Soundtrack appearances
"Go Big or Go Home" was featured in NBA videos showing highlights from the 2015 playoffs.
"Right Here Right Now" is featured on EA Sports game, Madden NFL 17.
"What We Live For" was featured in 2016 World Cup of Hockey video packages.

Track listing

Personnel
American Authors
Zac Barnett – lead vocals, guitar
James Adam Shelley – lead guitar, banjo, mandolin
Dave Rublin – bass, keyboard
Matt Sanchez – drums, percussion

Production
Aaron Accetta – producer
Shep Goodman – producer
Frequency – producer of "Mess With Your Heart"

Charts

Release history

References
Notes

Citations

External links

American Authors official website

2016 albums
American Authors albums
Albums produced by Aaron Accetta
Albums produced by Shep Goodman
Island Records albums